is a 1958 Japanese film directed by Kunio Watanabe.

Cast 
 Kazuo Hasegawa
 Narutoshi Hayashi
 Raizo Ichikawa

References

External links 
 
 

1958 films
Films directed by Kunio Watanabe
Daiei Film films
1950s Japanese films